Inwood is a ghost town located in Sunflower County, Mississippi, on Mississippi Highway 3.

Inwood was a station on the Yazoo Delta Railroad (the "Yellow Dog"), established between Moorhead and Ruleville during the 1890s.

References

Former populated places in Sunflower County, Mississippi
Former populated places in Mississippi